
Gmina Andrychów is an urban-rural gmina (administrative district) in Wadowice County, Lesser Poland Voivodeship, in southern Poland.

Villages
Apart from the town of Andrychów, Gmina Andrychów contains the villages and settlements of Brzezinka, Inwałd, Roczyny, Rzyki, Sułkowice, Targanice and Zagórnik.

Neighbouring gminas
Gmina Andrychów is bordered by the gminas of Kęty, Łękawica, Porąbka, Ślemień, Stryszawa and Wieprz.

References

Polish official population figures 2006

External links
The old website (archived)

Andrychow
Wadowice County